Aitkenvale Aerodrome was an aerodrome located  southwest of Townsville, Queensland, Australia near Aitkenvale Weir on the banks of the Ross River. It was also known as Weir and Aitkenvale Weir.

The aerodrome was constructed in 1942, during World War II, for the Royal Australian Air Force (RAAF) as part of a group of airfields to be used as aircraft dispersal fields in the event of Imperial Japanese attack on the Townsville area.

Located adjacent to the Weir State School, it became operational on 9 April 1942. Initially consisting of a  gravel NE-SW runway, which was later sealed with bitumen.

It was abandoned after the war and has been redeveloped for housing.

Units based at Aitkenvale Aerodrome
 No. 1 Reserve Personnel Pool RAAF
 No. 24 Squadron RAAF
 No. 84 Squadron RAAF
 No. 36 Squadron RAAF

Aircraft crashes
November 1943 - P-40N Kittyhawk, Serial No. A29-498 (#42-104720)
19 June 1944 - P-40 Kittyhawk, Serial No. A29-704

See also
 List of airports in Queensland

References
Marks, Roger R. (1994). Queensland airfields WW2-- 50 years on. - 

Former Royal Australian Air Force bases
World War II airfields in Australia
Buildings and structures in Townsville
Defunct airports in Queensland
Airports established in 1942
1942 establishments in Australia
Queensland in World War II